Edward Hugh McDaniel (June 19, 1938 – April 18, 2002) was an American Choctaw-Chickasaw professional American football player and professional wrestler better known by his ring name Wahoo McDaniel. He is notable for having held the NWA United States Heavyweight Championship five times. McDaniel was a major star in the American Wrestling Association and prominent National Wrestling Alliance affiliated promotions such as Championship Wrestling from Florida, Georgia Championship Wrestling, NWA Big Time Wrestling and, most notably, Jim Crockett Promotions.

McDaniel is often compared to his contemporary, Chief Jay Strongbow, due to both portraying similar Native American gimmicks. Unlike Strongbow (who was Italian-American), McDaniel was legitimately Native American.

Early life
McDaniel was born in the small town of Bernice, Louisiana in 1938. His father worked in oil and he moved to several towns before settling down in Midland, Texas, while McDaniel was in middle school. He attended Midland High School, where he was a track state champion in the shot put and second in the state in the discus. One of his baseball coaches, particularly for his Pony League team, was George H. W. Bush. The name "Wahoo" actually came from his father Hugh, who was known as "Big Wahoo". Though he was a problematic teenager, he was accepted to the University of Oklahoma by Bud Wilkinson. He became a member of the Sigma Chi fraternity and was also a part of Wilkinson's Sooners football program, where he holds the record for the longest punt at 91 yards.

Professional football career
McDaniel began his career as a professional football player in 1960, playing for the Houston Oilers during their inaugural AFL Championship-winning season. He then played for the Denver Broncos between 1961 and 1963. After he started playing as a linebacker for the New York Jets in 1964, McDaniel started wearing a custom jersey which had the name "Wahoo" sewn on the back above jersey 54, and whenever he made a tackle as a Jet, the public address announcer would ask the crowd WHO made that tackle, in which the crowd would shout, "Wahoo! Wahoo! Wahoo!" After two seasons with the Jets, McDaniel went to the Miami Dolphins in 1966, and played with this team until his retirement after the 1968 season.

Professional wrestling career
While with the Houston Oilers, McDaniel also trained with NWA Amarillo wrestling promoter Dory Funk Sr. and became a professional wrestler as a way to supplement his income by the time he was traded to the Denver Broncos in 1961. After he was traded to the New York Jets in 1964, McDaniel began wrestling for Vincent J. McMahon's World Wide Wrestling Federation (WWWF). The promoter wanted him to play off his Native American heritage, thus he was given the moniker "Chief" Wahoo McDaniel. After he was traded to the Miami Dolphins in 1966, McDaniel began wrestling for Eddie Graham's Championship Wrestling from Florida (CWF). When his football career ended in 1969, McDaniel became a full-time wrestler. In his first year as a full-time wrestler, McDaniel became involved in NWA Texas and won the NWA Texas Heavyweight Championship.

While wrestling in the American Wrestling Association (AWA), McDaniel engaged in a feud with Superstar Billy Graham. Along with Johnny Valentine, Superstar Billy Graham was regarded as one of McDaniel's earliest and bitter rivals. Between 1973 and 1974, McDaniel And Superstar would engage in numerous wrestling bouts in what was considered one of the AWA's top-drawing feuds of the 1970s. Some of these bouts included Indian Strap Matches and also tag team matches which pitted McDaniel and The Crusher against Superstar and Ivan Koloff. In 1974, McDaniel came to Mid-Atlantic to wrestle for Jim Crockett Promotions and help build up the territory as a singles territory in a feud with a rival from Texas, Johnny Valentine. The feud evolved into a tag feud with McDaniel and Paul Jones taking on Valentine and Ric Flair, who McDaniel met in the AWA.

McDaniel and Valentine had a historical feud remembered for the sheer force of their punch/chop exchanges, both men widely known for their hard-hitting style. McDaniel won the Mid-Atlantic title from Valentine on June 29, 1975, in Asheville, North Carolina. In 1977, Johnny Valentine's son Greg Valentine attacked McDaniel and broke his leg in an angle to establish Greg as Johnny's successor. Valentine originally won the title on June 11, 1977, with McDaniel regaining it in Raleigh, North Carolina two months later. On September 7, 1977, Valentine regained the title at the WRAL-TV studio tapings, breaking McDaniel's leg in the process. This angle is particularly remembered for a follow-up interview weeks later with Flair and Valentine throwing change at McDaniel, and Valentine asking him if he needed a custom-made wheelchair for his fat body. Valentine then infuriated fans (thus building up the demand for a rematch) by parading around in T-shirts which read "I Broke Wahoo's Leg" and "No More Wahoo."

McDaniel also worked for World Championship Wrestling's Slamboree 1993: A Legends' Reunion on May 23, 1993, where he teamed with Blackjack Mulligan and Jim Brunzell and fought Dick Murdoch, Don Muraco and Jimmy Snuka to a no-contest. At Slamboree on May 23, 1995, he defeated Murdoch. He also worked in independent shows until retiring in 1996.

Personal life
McDaniel was married four times to three different women. With his first wife, Monta Rae, he had two daughters, Nikki, born in June 1963 and living in Houston and Cindi, born in October 1965 and living in Azle, Texas. He has four grandchildren, and two great grandchildren from Dustin (Vayda and Bo Wayne) and Brittany through Nikki and twins, Morgan and Taylor, through Cindi. He was also an avid golfer and hunter.

McDaniel's health started to deteriorate in the mid-1990s, which led to his retirement in 1996, and he eventually lost both kidneys in 2000. He was awaiting a kidney transplant when he suffered a stroke and died of complications from diabetes and kidney failure on April 18, 2002 in Houston, Texas. His body was cremated and his ashes are with his daughter Nikki Houston, Texas.

Championships and accomplishments 

American Championship Wrestling
ACW World Heavyweight Championship (1 time)
ACW United States Championship (1 time)
American Wrestling Association
AWA World Tag Team Championship (1 time) - with Crusher Lisowski (1 time) (Title change is not recognized outside of Denver, Co)
Cauliflower Alley Club
Other honoree (1996)
Championship Wrestling from Florida
NWA Florida Heavyweight Championship (1 time)
NWA Florida Television Championship (1 time)
NWA Southern Heavyweight Championship (Florida version) (2 times)
NWA United States Tag Team Championship (Florida version) (1 time) – with Billy Jack Haynes
NWA World Tag Team Championship (Florida version) (2 times) – with Jose Lothario
Georgia Championship Wrestling
NWA Georgia Heavyweight Championship (2 times)
NWA Georgia Tag Team Championship (1 time) – with Tommy Rich
NWA Macon Heavyweight Championship (1 time)
International Pro Wrestling
IWA World Heavyweight Championship (1 time)
Mid-Atlantic Championship Wrestling / Jim Crockett Promotions / World Championship Wrestling
NWA Mid-Atlantic Heavyweight Championship (7 times)
NWA National Heavyweight Championship (1 time)
NWA United States Heavyweight Championship (5 times)
NWA World Tag Team Championship (Mid-Atlantic version) (4 times) – with Mark Youngblood (2), Rufus R. Jones (1), and Paul Jones (1)
WCW Hall of Fame (Class of 1995)
Cadillac Cup (1976)
NWA United States Championship Tournament (1984)
Mid-Atlantic Wrestling Alliance
MAWA Heavyweight Championship (1 time)
National Wrestling Federation
NWF World Tag Team Championship (1 time) – with Chief White Owl
National Wrestling Alliance
NWA Hall of Fame (Class of 2011)
NWA Big Time Wrestling
NWA American Heavyweight Championship (2 times)
NWA American Tag Team Championship (3 times) – with Johnny Valentine (2), and Thunderbolt Paterson(1)
NWA Texas Heavyweight Championship (2 times)
NWA Texas Tag Team Championship (1 time) – with Tony Parisi
North American Wrestling Alliance
NAWA Heavyweight Championship (2 times)
Professional Wrestling Hall of Fame and Museum
Class of 2010
Pro Wrestling Illustrated
PWI Most Popular Wrestler of the Year (1976)
PWI ranked him # 97 of the 500 best singles wrestlers during the "PWI Years" in 2003.
Southern Championship Wrestling
SCW Hall of Fame (Class of 1998)
Southern States Wrestling
Kingsport Wrestling Hall of Fame (Class of 2000)
Southwest Championship Wrestling
SCW Southwest Heavyweight Championship (2 times)
SCW Southwest Tag Team Championship (1 time) – with Terry Funk
SCW World Tag Team Championship (1 time) – with Ivan Putski
Ultimate Championship Wrestling
UCW Heavyweight Championship (1 time)
WWE
WWE Hall of Fame (Class of 2019)
Wrestling Observer Newsletter
Wrestling Observer Newsletter Hall of Fame (Class of 2002)

See also
 Other American Football League players

References

External links 
 
 
 

1938 births
2002 deaths
20th-century Native Americans
21st-century Native Americans
American Football League players
American football linebackers
American football punters
American football offensive guards
American male professional wrestlers
Chickasaw people
Choctaw people
Denver Broncos (AFL) players
Houston Oilers players
Miami Dolphins players
Native American professional wrestlers
New York Jets players
NWA/WCW/WWE United States Heavyweight Champions
Oklahoma Sooners football players
People from Delaware County, Oklahoma
People from Midland, Texas
Professional wrestlers from Oklahoma
Professional Wrestling Hall of Fame and Museum
WWE Hall of Fame Legacy inductees
Deaths from kidney failure
Deaths from diabetes
University of Oklahoma alumni
20th-century professional wrestlers
NWF World Tag Team Champions
NWA National Heavyweight Champions
NWA Florida Heavyweight Champions
NWA Florida Television Champions
NWA Southern Heavyweight Champions (Florida version)
NWA World Tag Team Champions (Florida version)
NWA United States Tag Team Champions (Florida version)
WCW World Tag Team Champions
NWA Macon Heavyweight Champions
NWA Georgia Heavyweight Champions
NWA Georgia Tag Team Champions
Native American players of American football